The 2010 San Antonio Silver Stars season was the 14th season overall for the franchise in the Women's National Basketball Association, and their 8th in San Antonio.

Transactions

Dispersal draft
Based on the Silver Stars' 2009 record, they would pick 5th in the Sacramento Monarchs dispersal draft. The Silver Stars picked Laura Harper.

WNBA Draft
The following are the Silver Stars' selections in the 2010 WNBA Draft.

Transaction log
February 2: The Silver Stars re-signed free agent Ruth Riley.
February 19: The Silver Stars acquired Roneeka Hodges from the Minnesota Lynx in exchange for the right to swap second round picks in the 2011 WNBA Draft.
February 24: The Silver Stars signed Quianna Chaney to a training camp contract.
February 25: Dan Hughes announced that he would step aside from the head coaching position and promoted Sandy Brondello to head coach.
March 9: The Silver Stars signed Tasha Humphrey to a training camp contract.
March 10: The Silver Stars re-signed Shanna Crossley.
March 11: The Silver Stars traded Dalma Ivanyi and the right to swap second round picks in the 2011 WNBA Draft to the Atlanta Dream in exchange for Michelle Snow.
April 6: The Silver Stars signed Deonna Davis to a training camp contract.
April 14: The Silver Stars traded Shanna Crossley to the Tulsa Shock in exchange for Crystal Kelly.
April 22: The Silver Stars re-signed Edwige Lawson-Wade.
April 28: The Silver Stars re-signed Belinda Snell.
April 29: The Silver Stars waived Brittany Jackson.
May 5: The Silver Stars waived Dee Davis and Diana Delva.
May 9: The Silver Stars waived Krystal Vaughn and Alexis Rack.
May 13: The Silver Stars waived Quianna Chaney, Lacey Simpson and Charel Allen.
May 14: The Silver Stars waived Alysha Clark and Tasha Humphrey.
May 21: The Silver Stars signed Chamique Holdsclaw and waived Belinda Snell.
June 9: The Silver Stars signed Allie Quigley and waived Crystal Kelly.
June 29: The Silver Stars waived Megan Frazee and signed Crystal Kelly.
July 15: The Silver Stars waived Allie Quigley.
August 11: The Silver Stars signed Ashley Battle.

Trades

Free agents

Additions

Subtractions

Roster

Depth

Season standings

Schedule

Preseason

|- align="center" bgcolor="bbffbb"
| 1 || May 4 || 8:00pm || China National Team || 91-57 || N/A || N/A || N/A || Incarnate Word  N/A || 1-0
|- align="center" bgcolor="bbffbb"
| 2 || May 8 || 3:30pm || @ Los Angeles || 86-77 || Belinda Snell (17) || Alysha Clark (7) || Helen Darling (4) || Walter Pyramid  1,521 || 2-0
|-

Regular season

|- align="center" bgcolor="ffbbbb"
| 1 || May 15 || 8:00pm || Atlanta || FS-SW || 70-75 || Hammon (20) || Riley (6) || Hammon (5) || AT&T Center  9,409 || 0-1
|- align="center" bgcolor="bbffbb"
| 2 || May 20 || 12:30pm || @ Tulsa || NBATVFS-SWFS-OK || 83-74 || Young (23) || Snow (15) || Hammon (7) || BOK Center  4,636 || 1-1
|- align="center" bgcolor="bbffbb"
| 3 || May 22 || 8:00pm || Los Angeles || NBATVFS-SW || 88-81 || Holdsclaw (19) || Snow (10) || Hammon, Holdsclaw (5) || AT&T Center  7,862 || 2-1
|- align="center" bgcolor="ffbbbb"
| 4 || May 28 || 8:00pm || New York ||  || 71-77 || Young (17) || Riley (6) || Hammon (8) || AT&T Center  5,293 || 2-2
|- align="center" bgcolor="ffbbbb"
| 5 || May 30 || 3:00pm || Seattle ||  || 56-84 || Hodges (12) || Snow (6) || Snow (3) || AT&T Center  4,924 || 2-3
|-

|- align="center" bgcolor="ffbbbb"
| 6 || June 3 || 7:00pm || @ Indiana || FS-SWFS-I || 57-79 || Holdsclaw (12) || Holdsclaw (5) || Lawson-Wade (4) || Conseco Fieldhouse  7,574 || 2-4
|- align="center" bgcolor="ffbbbb"
| 7 || June 6 || 1:00pm || @ Connecticut ||  || 68-81 || Young (21) || Snow (10) || Lawson-Wade (9) || Mohegan Sun Arena  6,292 || 2-5
|- align="center" bgcolor="bbffbb"
| 8 || June 11 || 8:00pm || Tulsa ||  || 87-75 || Holdsclaw (19) || Holdsclaw (11) || Lawson-Wade (9) || AT&T Center  7,076 || 3-5
|- align="center" bgcolor="ffbbbb"
| 6 || June 13 || 3:00pm || @ Atlanta || NBATVSSO || 83-90 || Young (24) || Holdsclaw (9) || Lawson-Wade (7) || Philips Arena  6,050 || 3-6
|- align="center" bgcolor="bbffbb"
| 7 || June 18 || 10:00pm || @ Phoenix ||  || 108-105 || Young (25) || Young (10) || Hammon (10) || US Airways Center  6,147 || 4-6
|- align="center" bgcolor="ffbbbb"
| 8 || June 20 || 9:00pm || @ Seattle || NBATVFS-SW || 61-82 || Hammon, Holdsclaw (12) || Holdsclaw (9) || Hammon (5) || KeyArena  8,086 || 4-7
|- align="center" bgcolor="bbffbb"
| 7 || June 26 || 8:00pm || Minnesota || NBATVFS-SW || 80-66 || Snow (23) || Snow (9) || Hammon (10) || AT&T Center  10,184 || 5-7
|- align="center" bgcolor="ffbbbb"
| 8 || June 29 || 10:00pm || @ Seattle ||  || 72-86 || Hammon (24) || Appel, Holdsclaw (6) || 5 players (1) || KeyArena  7,823 || 5-8
|-

|- align="center" bgcolor="ffbbbb"
| 8 || July 1 || 10:30pm || @ Los Angeles ||  || 63-73 || Snow (16) || Snow (8) || Lawson-Wade (5) || STAPLES Center  7,803 || 5-9
|- align="center" bgcolor="bbffbb"
| 7 || July 6 || 8:00pm || Connecticut || ESPN2 || 79-66 || Young (19) || Snow, Young (8) || Hammon (8) || AT&T Center  7,264 || 6-9
|- align="center" bgcolor="ffbbbb"
| 8 || July 8 || 8:00pm || @ Minnesota ||  || 66-89 || Hodges (15) || Young (5) || Darling (5) || Target Center  7,182 || 6-10
|- align="center" bgcolor="ffbbbb"
| 8 || July 14 || 12:30pm || @ Chicago || CN100 || 61-88 || Young (14) || Snow (8) || Darling, Hammon, Young (4) || Allstate Arena  6,950 || 6-11
|- align="center" bgcolor="ffbbbb"
| 7 || July 16 || 8:00pm || Tulsa ||  || 70-75 || Holdsclaw (20) || Young (11) || Snow (4) || AT&T Center  9,298 || 6-12
|- align="center" bgcolor="bbffbb"
| 8 || July 18 || 3:00pm || Los Angeles ||  || 83-73 || Hodges (24) || Appel, Hodges (5) || Hammon (7) || AT&T Center  6,542 || 7-12
|- align="center" bgcolor="ffbbbb"
| 8 || July 20 || 12:30pm || Seattle || NBATVFS-SW || 74-80 || Young (18) || Young (7) || Hammon (10) || AT&T Center  12,414 || 7-13
|- align="center" bgcolor="bbffbb"
| 7 || July 22 || 8:00pm || @ Minnesota ||  || 74-72 || Holdsclaw (17) || Holdsclaw (8) || Darling (4) || Target Center  6,126 || 8-13
|- align="center" bgcolor="ffbbbb"
| 8 || July 24 || 8:00pm || Chicago || CN100 || 72-75 || Hodges, Snow (13) || Snow (11) || Young (5) || AT&T Center  8,999 || 8-14
|- align="center" bgcolor="ffbbbb"
| 8 || July 27 || 7:30pm || @ New York || ESPN2 || 72-77 || Holdsclaw (18) || Holdsclaw (9) || Hammon, Snow (4) || Madison Square Garden  10,712 || 8-15
|- align="center" bgcolor="bbffbb"
| 7 || July 29 || 7:00pm || @ Washington || NBATVCSN-MA || 79-75 || Holdsclaw (17) || Holdsclaw (11) || Hammon (6) || Verizon Center  9,212 || 9-15
|- align="center" bgcolor="bbffbb"
| 8 || July 30 || 8:00pm || @ Tulsa || NBATVFS-OK || 101-85 || Hammon (22) || Snow (7) || Hammon, Holdsclaw, Lawson-Wade (3) || BOK Center  5,203 || 10-15
|-

|- align="center" bgcolor="ffbbbb"
| 8 || August 3 || 8:00pm || Phoenix ||  || 92-103 || Young (24) || Holdsclaw, Snow (7) || Hammon (11) || AT&T Center  6,116 || 10-16
|- align="center" bgcolor="ffbbbb"
| 7 || August 6 || 10:00pm || @ Phoenix ||  || 87-103 || Hammon, Holdsclaw (21) || Holdsclaw (9) || Snow (4) || US Airways Center  12,909 || 10-17
|- align="center" bgcolor="bbffbb"
| 8 || August 8 || 8:00pm || @ Los Angeles || NBATVFS-SWFS-W || 92-83 || Hodges (19) || Young (10) || Hammon (7) || STAPLES Center  9,793 || 11-17
|- align="center" bgcolor="ffbbbb"
| 8 || August 10 || 8:00pm || Minnesota ||  || 66-73 || Young (19) || Snow (10) || Hammon (8) || AT&T Center  5,142 || 11-18
|- align="center" bgcolor="bbffbb"
| 7 || August 13 || 8:00pm || Tulsa ||  || 94-74 || Holdslcaw (18) || Kelly (9) || Hammon (8) || AT&T Center  10,244 || 12-18
|- align="center" bgcolor="ffbbbb"
| 8 || August 15 || 7:00pm || @ Minnesota || NBATVFS-SWFS-N || 78-84 || Hammon (30) || Hammon, Hodges (6) || Hammon, Hodges, Young (3) || Target Center  8,678 || 12-19
|- align="center" bgcolor="ffbbbb"
| 8 || August 17 || 8:00pm || Washington ||  || 76-66 || Young (19) || Hodges, Snow (5) || Hammon (5) || AT&T Center  6,801 || 12-20
|- align="center" bgcolor="bbffbb"
| 7 || August 20 || 8:00pm || Indiana ||  || 75-61 || Young (22) || Snow (8) || Hammon, Snow (6) || AT&T Center  10,807 || 13-20
|- align="center" bgcolor="bbffbb"
| 8 || August 22 || 3:00pm || Phoenix ||  || 83-82 || Hammon (30) || Young (10) || Hodges (6) || AT&T Center  8,331 || 14-20
|-

| All games are viewable on WNBA LiveAccess

Postseason

|- align="center" bgcolor="ffbbbb"
| 1 || August 26 || 9:00pm || @ Phoenix || ESPN2 || 93-106 || Hammon (19) || Young (9) || Hammon, Snow (4) || US Airways Center  8,927 || 0-1 
|- align="center" bgcolor="ffbbbb"
| 2 || August 28 || 1:00pm || Phoenix || ESPN2 || 73-92 || Hammon (21) || Young (9) || Hammon (7) || AT&T Center  6,763 || 0-2 
|-

Statistics

Regular season

Postseason

Awards and honors
Jayne Appel was named to the 2010 WNBA All-Star Team as a WNBA reserve.
Becky Hammon was named to the 2010 WNBA All-Star Team as a WNBA reserve.
Michelle Snow was named to the 2010 WNBA All-Star Team as a WNBA starter.
Sophia Young was named to the 2010 WNBA All-Star Team as a WNBA reserve.

References

External links

San Antonio Stars seasons
San Antonio